The 2012 World Outdoor Bowls Championship was held at the Lockleys Bowling Club in Adelaide, Australia, from 24 November to 9 December 2012.

Some of the qualifying rounds were held at the nearby Holdfast Bowling Club in Glenelg North.

Leif Selby won the men's singles Gold and the pairing of Alex Marshall and Paul Foster took the pairs Gold. Scotland also won the triples but Australia struck Gold in the fours and Leonard Trophy.

In the women's events Australia were dominant winning the singles won by Karen Murphy, pairs, triples and Taylor Trophy. Only the Scotland team managed to stop a complete clean sweep after claiming the fours.

Medallists

Results

W.M.Leonard Trophy

Taylor Trophy

References

 
World Outdoor Bowls Championship
Bowls in Australia
Sports competitions in Adelaide
2012 in Australian sport
2012 in bowls
November 2012 sports events in Australia
December 2012 sports events in Australia